Rewind is the ninth studio album by American country music group Rascal Flatts. It was released on May 13, 2014 via Big Machine Records. The album was produced by Rascal Flatts, Howard Benson and Dann Huff. A deluxe edition is available at Target with four bonus tracks. With the exception of the deluxe edition track "She Must Like Broken Hearts", this is the group's only album to not feature any songwriting credits from the group themselves. It is their final album to be produced by Huff, whose relationship with the group began with their 2006 album Me and My Gang. This is the band's last album to top the Billboard Country Albums chart.

Critical reception

Stephen Thomas Erlewine of AllMusic rated the album four stars out of five, writing that "it's hard not to succumb to Rascal Flatts' smooth touch." At Country Weekly, Bob Paxman graded the album a B+, stating that "Rewind is a great-sounding album that brings Flatts back to country's forefront." At USA Today, Brian Mansfield rated the album two-and-a-half stars out of four, remarking how "The trio retools its style with mixed results", yet its "High-flown ballads remain a strength, and Joe Don Rooney fans will thrill to his guitar work": however, "Elsewhere, the group just sounds as if like it's trying to keep up with the times."

Commercial performance
The album debuted at No. 5 on the Billboard 200 and No. 1 on the Top Country Albums chart with sales of 61,000 in the US. As of June 2015,
the album has sold 257,000 copies in the US.

Track listing

Personnel 
Rascal Flatts
  Jay DeMarcus – bass guitar, mandolin, programming, backing vocals
 Gary LeVox – lead and backing vocals
 Joe Don Rooney – acoustic guitar, electric guitar, backing vocals

Additional Musicians
 Tim Akers – keyboards, acoustic piano
 Howard Benson – keyboards, additional programming, backing vocals
 Charles Judge – keyboards, synthesizers, accordion, Hammond B3 organ
 Don Koch – programming
 Kris Crunk – synthesizers, orchestra programming
 James Matchack – synthesizers, orchestra programming 
 Gordon Mote – acoustic piano
 Lenny Skolnik – programming
 Rob McNelley – acoustic guitar, electric guitar
 Tim Pierce – additional guitars
 Ilya Toshinsky – acoustic guitar, electric guitar, banjo, bouzouki, mandolin
 Dan Dugmore – steel guitar
 Paul Franklin – steel guitar
 Dorian Crozier – drums
 Josh Freese – drums
 Eric Darken – percussion 
 Jeneé Fleener – fiddle
 Kim Keyes – backing vocals
 Gail Mayes – backing vocals
 Drea Rhenee – backing vocals

Strings
 David Campbell – arrangements and conductor
 Suzie Katayama – contractor 
 John Catchings, Erika Duke-Kirkpatrick, Suzie Katayama, Steve Richards and Rudy Stein – cello
 Jeneé Fleener, Matthew Funes and Roland Kato – viola 
 Kevin Connolly, Nina Evtuhov, Jeneé Fleener, Julian Hallmark, Songa Lee, Natalie Leggett, Mario de Leon, Grace Oh, Sara Parkins, Michele Richards and Josefina Vergara  – violin

Technical Credits 
 Mike Plotnikoff – recording (1, 3, 5, 7, 9)
 Sean Neff – recording (2, 4, 6, 8, 10-13)
 Steve Churchyard – string recording
 Hatsukazu Inagaki – additional engineer (1, 3, 5, 7, 9), overdub recording (1, 3, 5, 7, 9)
 Dmitar Krnjaic – additional recording (1, 3, 5, 7, 9), recording assistant (1, 3, 5, 7, 9)
 Alexander Attalla – recording assistant (1, 3, 5, 7, 9)
 Anthony Diaz De Leon – recording assistant (1, 3, 5, 7, 9)
 Zack Foster – recording assistant (1, 3, 5, 7, 9)
 Anthony Martinez – recording assistant (1, 3, 5, 7, 9)
 Ernesto Olvera – recording assistant (1, 3, 5, 7, 9)
  David Schwerkholt – recording assistant (1, 3, 5, 7, 9)
 Leland Elliott – overdub assistant (1, 3, 5, 7, 9)
 Nick Lane – recording assistant (2, 4, 6, 8, 10-13)
 Taylor Nyquist – recording assistant (2, 4, 6, 8, 10-13)
 Chris Lord-Alge – mixing (1, 3, 5, 7, 9)
 Justin Niebank – mixing (2, 4, 6, 8, 10-13)
 Keith Armstrong – mix assistant (1, 3, 5, 7, 9)
 Nik Karpen – mix assistant (1, 3, 5, 7, 9)
 Drew Bollman – mix assistant (2, 4, 6, 8, 10-13)
 Paul DeCarli – digital editing (1, 3, 5, 7, 9)
 David Huff – digital editing (2, 4, 6, 8, 10-13)
 Adam Ayan – mastering
 Marc VanGool – guitar technician (1, 3, 5, 7, 9)
 Jon Nicholson – drum technician (1, 3, 5, 7, 9)

Additional Credits 
 Allison Jones – A&R (1, 3, 5, 7, 9)
 Kelly King – A&R (1, 3, 5, 7, 9)
 Matt Griffin – production coordination (1, 3, 5, 7, 9)
 LeAnn Bennett – production coordination (2, 4, 6, 8, 10-13)
 Mike "Frog" Griffith – production coordination (2, 4, 6, 8, 10-13)
 Sandi Spika Borchetta – art direction
 John Murphy – art direction, wardrobe 
 Torne White – graphic design
 Sheryl Nields – photography
 Mellissa Schleicher – hair stylist, make-up

Charts

Weekly charts

Year-end charts

References

2014 albums
Rascal Flatts albums
Big Machine Records albums
Albums produced by Howard Benson